Bantul is a town and district, and the capital of Bantul Regency, Special Region of Yogyakarta, Indonesia. Bantul has numerous firms and agencies (service stations and garages, banks, schools, medical clinics, government offices) which supply services to the surrounding area. A main road runs down from Yogyakarta through Bantul to the busy beach area of Parangtritis visited by many tourists from Yogyakarta each weekend.

2006 earthquake

On 27 May 2006 an earthquake measuring 6.4 on the moment magnitude scale struck near Java's southern coast causing widespread damage. Bantul Regency was the region most affected by the disaster. More than 2,000 residents of Bantul were killed, thousands of its residents injured, and 80% of its homes damaged or destroyed.

Climate
Bantul has a tropical monsoon climate (Am) with moderate to little rainfall from June to October and heavy to very heavy rainfall from November to May.

References

Districts of the Special Region of Yogyakarta
Regency seats of the Special Region of Yogyakarta
Bantul Regency
Geography of the Special Region of Yogyakarta